The 2022 Beach Volleyball World Championships were held in Rome, Italy from 10 to 19 June 2022. After the 2022 Russian invasion of Ukraine, FIVB banned all Russian and Belarusian athletes and officials from participating at the championships.

Competition schedule

Medal events

Medal table

Medal summary

Men's tournament

Knockout stage bracket

Women's tournament

Knockout stage bracket

References

External links
FIVB website

 
Beach Volleyball World Championships
Beach Volleyball Championships
2022 in Italian sport
2022 in beach volleyball
Volleyball in Rome
Beach Volleyball World Championships
Sports events affected by the 2022 Russian invasion of Ukraine